Jesse Levine was the defending champion but was defeated in the First Round by Tennys Sandgren.
Michael Russell won the final 6–3, 6–2 against Bobby Reynolds.

Seeds

Draw

Finals

Top half

Bottom half

References
 Main Draw
 Qualifying Draw

Knoxville Challenger - Singles
2012 Singles